Chabówko  (German: Neu Falkenberg) is a village in the administrative district of Gmina Bielice, within Pyrzyce County, West Pomeranian Voivodeship, in north-western Poland.

References

Villages in Pyrzyce County